Beach soccer, also known as beach football, sand football or beasal, is a variant of association football played on a beach or some form of sand.

Whilst football has been played informally on beaches, the introduction of beach soccer was an attempt to codify rules for the game. This was done in 1992 by the founders of Beach Soccer Worldwide, a company set up to develop the sport and responsible for the majority of its tournaments.

History 

Beach football ( or futebol de areia) started in Brazil, more precisely at Rio de Janeiro. In 1950 the first official tournament was created to unite neighborhood small tournaments that happened since 1940. It has grown to be an international game. The participation of international players such as Eric Cantona, Michel, Julio Salinas, Romário, Júnior and Zico has helped to expand television coverage to audiences in over 170 countries.

Beach soccer had been played recreationally for years and in different formats. In 1992 the laws of the game were envisioned and a pilot event was staged by the founding partners of BSWW in Los Angeles and the sport was adopted by Beach Soccer Los Angeles in 2017 where the game is played all around Los Angeles County. By 1993, the first professional beach soccer competition was organized at Miami Beach with teams from the United States, Brazil, Argentina and Italy taking part.

In April 1994 the first event to be covered by network television transmissions was held on Copacabana Beach in Rio de Janeiro and the city hosted the first Beach Soccer World Championship in 1995. The competition was won by the host nation, making Brazil the first-ever World Champions of Beach Soccer. Commercial interest begin to match developments on the field and growing demand for the sport around the world gave rise to the Pro Beach Soccer Tour in 1996.

The first Pro Beach Soccer Tour included a total of 60 games in two years across South America, Europe, Asia and the United States. Interest generated by the tour in Europe led to the creation of the European Pro Beach Soccer League in 1998, providing a more solid infrastructure that would increase the professionalism of the spectacle. EPBSL, now known as the Euro BS League, brought promoters together from across the continent and satisfied the demands of the media, sponsors and fans. Four years on from its creation, the first step in the building of a legitimate worldwide competition structure for the sport of pro beach soccer had been taken.

Behind the scenes developments were also taking place, with the Beach Soccer Company relocating its headquarters to Europe firstly to Monaco and then Barcelona before becoming Pro Beach Soccer, S.L. in April 2000. One year later they would join forces with Octagon Koch Tavares (who had continued to organise the World Championships and events in South America) to form a single entity known as Beach Soccer Worldwide (BSWW) with the aim of unifying all major Pro Beach Soccer tournaments in the world under the same structure and providing representation of the sport to major sponsors, the media and FIFA.

FIFA became the global governing body of the sport in 2005, acknowledging BSWW's framework and organizing the first FIFA Beach Soccer World Cup.

The next four years would see this growth consolidated by further progress both on and off the field. By 2004, some 17 nations had entered teams, with this number expected to rise to over stage events.

Such interest has allowed BSWW to strike certain sponsorship deals with international companies including McDonald's, Coca-Cola and MasterCard, who stepped up their involvement in 2004 and are now title sponsors of the Euro BS League. Recognition has also come from FIFA who have cited BSWW as the major entity behind the creation and growth of Beach Soccer, forming a "highly promising" partnership that was "in its full splendour" seen in the 2005 world cup, held in Copacabana Beach, Brazil. France won the first world cup and the next year Brazil won it
at the same venue. The World Cup has continued to flourish with the first held outside Brazil in 2008 and future World Cups spreading as far out as Tahiti in 2013 and Portugal in 2015.

The Women's Euro Beach Soccer Cup and Women's Euro Winners Cup were first held in 2016, whereas the Women's Euro Beach Soccer League debuted in 2021. In addition, the 2019 World Beach Games had a women's beach soccer tournament, and a Women's Intercontinental Beach Soccer Cup was held in 2021. As of 2022, FIFA and the other five continental confederations do not host women's beach soccer tournaments. The Asian Beach Games, European Games and South American Beach Games also do not have women's beach soccer tournaments.

Rules 
The rules of beach soccer are based on the Laws of the Game of association football, with some modifications.

Field 

A beach soccer field is a level sandy area smaller than a regular association football pitch. The field is cleared of pebbles and seashells along with any other objects which could injure a player.

The field is rectangular in shape and the touch line is longer than the goal line.
The field dimensions are:
 Length: 
 Width: 

The penalty area is within 9 m (9.8 yards) of the goals and is marked by a yellow flag situated in touch. Two red flags opposite each other are at the center of the field to represent the half-way line.

Players 
Each team consists of five players including the goalkeeper and an unlimited number of substitutions, from a selection of three to five players. Throw-ins and kick-ins mean the pace and flow of the game can be faster than regular football. Shoes and socks are not allowed; players must play in bare feet, although ankle guards are permitted. Goal clearances (the equivalent of a goal kick) are taken by the goalkeeper using their hands to throw the ball and a goal cannot be scored directly from these.

Match length 
A game lasts 36 minutes and is split up into three 12-minute periods. Unlike association football, in professional matches the referee is not the sole arbiter of the end of a period. A separate timekeeping official controls the official game clock, which is stopped for stoppages in play and typically counts down to zero, as in North American sports such as basketball and ice hockey. Draws are not permitted, with the game going into three minutes of golden goal extra time followed by a penalty shoot-out if the score is still on level terms after normal time. Unlike normal football, penalty kicks are directly decided by sudden death rules; it was changed since 2014 to three kicks from the penalty mark are taken, and the team that has scored more wins. If it is not decided after three kicks from the penalty mark, the sudden death rules will then be applied. Since 2021, the rules were changed again from three to five kicks from the penalty mark.

Referees and discipline 
Beach soccer has two on-field referees who co-operatively referee the game. They are assisted by a third referee who acts in a manner similar to football's fourth official and a timekeeper.

As in football, yellow and red cards can be issued. Unlike in association football, the team can then bring on a substitute to replace the dismissed player after two minutes. Similar to a power play in ice hockey, this period of numerical advantage ends early if the penalised team concedes a goal.

Free kicks and penalties 
Free kicks are awarded for various fouls. All free kicks are direct free kicks which has to be taken by the player who was fouled, unless awarded for deliberate handling. The laws specify that all players apart from the opposing goalkeeper must clear a zone between the kicker and the goal. Penalties are awarded for fouls within the penalty area.

Other major differences from football 

 The ball is inflated to a lower pressure (0.4–0.6 atm, compared to 0.6–1.1 atm in football).
 Instead of a throw-in, a team may choose to take a kick-in.
 Preventing an opponent doing a bicycle kick is a specific foul.
 Teams may not keep possession in their penalty area for more than four seconds.
 Goalkeepers may handle a back-pass from a teammate a maximum of once during their team's possession. This is considered reset once the opposing team has possessed the ball.

Tournaments 
The following are some of the competitions:

International 

 FIFA Beach Soccer World Cup
 Intercontinental Cup
 BSWW Mundialito
 Mundialito de Clubes
 Persian Beach Soccer Cup
 Lisović 2023.

Multi-sports games 
 World Beach Games
 Asian Beach Games
 Bolivarian Beach Games
 European Games
 Mediterranean Beach Games
 South American Beach Games

PRO/Amateur International 
 The Beach Soccer Championships – Oceanside, California – USA
 North American Sand Soccer Championships – Virginia Beach, Virginia – USA
 Sand Duels Beach Soccer – Ocean City, Maryland – USA

Confederation 
AFC (Asian Football Confederation):
 AFC Beach Soccer Asian Cup
CAF (Confederation of African Football):
 Africa Beach Soccer Cup of Nations
CONCACAF (Confederation of North, Central American and Caribbean Association Football):
 CONCACAF Beach Soccer Championship
CONMEBOL (South American Football Confederation):
 CONMEBOL Beach Soccer Championship
OFC (Oceania Football Confederation):
 OFC Beach Soccer Nations Cup
UEFA (Union of European Football Associations):
 Euro Beach Soccer Cup
 Euro Beach Soccer League
 UEFA Beach Soccer Championship
 BSWW Euro Winners Cup and Women's Euro Winners Cup

See also 

 Beach handball
 Beach rugby
 Beach volleyball
 Footvolley
 Futsal
 Street football
 Teqball

References

External links

 Laws of the Game at FIFA
 Beach Soccer Worldwide

 
Association football variants
Team sports
Sports originating in Brazil
Soccer
Athletic sports
Ball games